Christopher Jon Slayton (born August 6, 1996) is an American football defensive end for the Green Bay Packers of the National Football League (NFL). He played college football at Syracuse.

Professional career

New York Giants
Slayton was drafted by the New York Giants in the seventh round, 245th overall, of the 2019 NFL Draft. He was waived on August 31, 2019, and was signed to the practice squad the next day. He was promoted to the active roster on December 27, 2019.

On September 5, 2020, Slayton was waived from the Giants.

Buffalo Bills
On September 8, 2020, Slayton was signed to the Buffalo Bills practice squad. He was released on September 17.

Atlanta Falcons
On September 23, 2020, Slayton was signed to the Atlanta Falcons' practice squad. He was elevated to the active roster on October 17 for the team's week 6 game against the Minnesota Vikings, and reverted to the practice squad after the game. He signed a reserve/future contract on January 4, 2021.

On August 31, 2021, Slayton was waived by the Falcons and re-signed to the practice squad the next day. He was released on October 18.

Pittsburgh Steelers
On October 27, 2021, Slayton was signed to the Pittsburgh Steelers practice squad. However, he was released on November 2.

San Francisco 49ers
On November 18, 2021, Slayton was signed to the San Francisco 49ers practice squad. He signed a reserve/future contract with the 49ers on February 2, 2022. On May 23, 2022, he was released.

Green Bay Packers
On May 25, 2022, Slayton was claimed off waivers by the Green Bay Packers. He was waived on August 30, 2022, and signed to the practice squad the next day. He signed a reserve/future contract on January 10, 2023.

References

External links
Green Bay Packers bio
Syracuse Orange bio

1996 births
Living people
People from University Park, Illinois
Players of American football from Illinois
Sportspeople from the Chicago metropolitan area
Sportspeople from Cook County, Illinois
American football defensive tackles
Syracuse Orange football players
New York Giants players
Buffalo Bills players
Atlanta Falcons players
Pittsburgh Steelers players
San Francisco 49ers players
Green Bay Packers players